Georges Farrah,  (born August 23, 1957) is a Canadian politician.

Background

Born in Cap-aux-Meules, Magdalen Islands, Quebec, the son of Arthur Farrah and Hilda Boudreau, he was educated in administration at the University of Moncton.

Member of the legislature

Farrah was first elected to the National Assembly of Quebec as the MNA for Îles-de-la-Madeleine in 1985.  He was re-elected twice, served as chief opposition whip following the 1994 elections until his eventual defeat in 1998 to the Parti Québécois candidate Maxime Arseneau.

Federal politics

Farrah was member of the Liberal Party of Canada in the House of Commons of Canada, representing the riding of Bonaventure—Gaspé—Îles-de-la-Madeleine—Pabok from 2000 to 2004. Farrah is a former administrator. Farrah was Parliamentary Secretary to the Minister of Agriculture and Agri-Food with special emphasis on Rural Development, and Parliamentary Secretary to the Minister of Fisheries and Oceans.

He lost his seat in the 2004 election to Bloc Québécois candidate Raynald Blais.

References
 
 

1957 births
Living people
Liberal Party of Canada MPs
Members of the Executive Council of Quebec
Members of the House of Commons of Canada from Quebec
Members of the King's Privy Council for Canada
Quebec Liberal Party MNAs
People from Gaspésie–Îles-de-la-Madeleine
21st-century Canadian politicians